The history of women's ice hockey in the United States can be traced back to the early 20th century. In the 1920s, the Seattle Vamps competed in various hockey tournaments. In 1916, the United States hosted an international hockey tournament in Cleveland, Ohio, that featured Canadian and American women's hockey teams.

AWCHA
In 1997–98, the American Women's College Hockey Alliance debuted. It was a program funded through the USOC/NCAA Conference Grant Program. The AWCHA organized and developed activities with collegiate women's varsity ice hockey teams, and helped to promote women's ice hockey at all NCAA levels. The first AWCHA Division I National Ice Hockey Championship was held in March 1998. The New Hampshire Wildcats defeated the Brown Bears by a 4–1 score, to become the first recognized national champion in women's college ice hockey. In the 1999–2000 season, the Western Collegiate Hockey Association (WCHA) joined the Eastern College Athletic Conference (ECAC) as the second league in the nation to offer women's Division I competition.

There were two more AWCHA National Championships and then the NCAA became involved. In August 2000, the NCAA announced it would hold its first Division I Women's Ice Hockey National Championship. The Minnesota Duluth Bulldogs captured the first NCAA Division I Women's Ice Hockey Championship, defeating the St. Lawrence Skating Saints by a 4–2 tally on March 25, 2001.

NCAA

Notable games
February 28, 2010: The RPI Engineers women's ice hockey team made NCAA history. The Engineers beat Quinnipiac, 2–1, but it took five overtimes. It is now the longest college hockey game in NCAA history. Senior defenseman Laura Gersten had the game-winning goal. She registered it at 4:32 of the fifth overtime session to not only clinch the win, but the series victory. RPI advanced to the ECAC Hockey Women's Semifinals for the second consecutive season. The Engineers faced top ranked Cornell University.

Outdoor games
On Friday, January 8, 2010, Boston's Fenway Park played host to a Hockey East doubleheader. In the first game, the New Hampshire Wildcats team faced off against the Northeastern Huskies team in an outdoor college hockey doubleheader in the first outdoor women's hockey game in the sport's history. Northeastern surged to a 2–0 lead, but New Hampshire rallied to win 5–3. The latter game featured the men's teams from Boston College and Boston University, which BU won 3–2.
February 6, 2010: The No. 9 ranked Wisconsin Badgers team (16–10–3, 13–9–1 WCHA) defeated the Bemidji State Beavers team (8–14–7, 7–9–7 WCHA), 6–1, in the first ever Culver's Camp Randall Hockey Classic at Camp Randall Stadium. The Badgers played in front of an NCAA-record crowd of 8,263 fans in the second-ever women's hockey outdoor showdown. Sophomore Carolyne Prevost scored the first goal in Camp Randall history at the 16:53 mark and backhanded it in to put the Badgers up 1–0. The Badgers dominated offensively, outshooting the Beavers 42–13. Freshman Becca Ruegsegger (Lakewood, Colorado) finished with 13 saves in net for Wisconsin.

Ivy League women’s hockey
In 1964, the Brown Bears men's coach Jim Fullerton arranged for Nancy Schieffelin to attend a team practice. She was an experienced player and came to the practice disguised in full uniform. A year later, Brown University had the first women's ice hockey program. The team was known as the Pembroke Pandas. The Pandas had to borrow equipment, and sell hockey rule sheets at the Bears men's games to raise money for equipment. In February 1966, the Pandas (Brown Bears) women's ice hockey team played their first game. Against the Walpole Brooms, the club lost by a 4–1 score.

The Cornell women's hockey program was started in 1971, but did not play its first game until 1972. It was a 4–3 victory over Scarborough. In 1972, they played eight games and lost four. The Big Red lost twice to the Brown Bears.

Yale University debuted its women's ice hockey program on December 9, 1975. Its first match was versus Choate-Rosemary Hall. The Bulldogs prevailed by a 5–3 tally. Two years later, the Bulldogs hockey program attained varsity status. In 1976, Brown hosted the first ever Ivy League women's ice hockey tournament. The other competing schools were Cornell, Princeton and Yale. The Big Red won the tournament.

Dartmouth College welcomed women's ice hockey on January 7, 1978. The Big Green defeated Middlebury by a 6–5 score. The Big Green finished their inaugural season with 7 wins, 7 losses, and 1 tie. Against Ivy League teams, the Big Green were 1–3–1. In the 1978–79 season, the Harvard Crimson iced a women's team. Their first game was a 17–0 defeat at the hands of the Providence Friars. The next game was a 2–1 loss to the Yale Bulldogs.

The Harvard Crimson "iced" their first-ever regular season women's hockey team in the 1978–79 season. Their first game was a 17–0 defeat at the hands of the Providence Friars. In 1998–99, the Crimson finished with a record of 33–1. Of the 31 wins, the Crimson won 30 consecutive games to close the season. In the previous season, the Crimson had gone 14–16–0. The final game of that 30 game streak was a 6–5 overtime victory over the New Hampshire Wildcats in the AWCHA national championship game.

On November 24, 1979, the Princeton Tigers played their first varsity game against the University of Pennsylvania. In winter of 1982, Princeton snapped the Cornell Big Red women's ice hockey program's string of six straight Ivy League titles.

In 1998, the Patty Kazmaier Award was introduced, named after former Princeton Tigers player Patty Kazmaier.

In 1998–99, the Harvard Crimson finished with a record of 33–1. Led by head coach Katey Stone, the Crimson proceeded to win the American Women's College Hockey Alliance national championship.

Ivy League players accomplishments
In 1987, Mollie Marcoux-Samaan joined the Princeton Tigers. In her four years with the Tigers, Marcoux-Samaan would gain eight letters in athletics (hockey and soccer). In 1990, Dartmouth Big Green player Judy Parish Oberting was named to the first U.S. National Team that competed at the 1990 IIHF Women's World Championship. In 1998, Laurie Belliveau of Yale and Sarah Hood of Dartmouth were two Ivy League players named first team All-Americans. This was the first time that Ivy League women's hockey players were bestowed with such an honor.

During the 2003–04 season, Nicole Corriero of Harvard set an NCAA record with 59 goals scored in a season. In the same season, former Princeton player Laura Halldorson coached the Minnesota Golden Gophers women's ice hockey program to the 2004 NCAA title.

On January 18, 2003, Harvard beat the Boston College Eagles women's ice hockey program by a 17–2 mark, the largest margin of victory in NCAA history. Jennifer Botterill set an NCAA record (since tied) for most points in one game with 10 on January 28, 2003 versus Boston College. A few months later, Nicole Corriero tied Botterill's record for most points in one NCAA game with ten on November 7, 2003 versus the Union Dutchwomen. In addition, she holds the NCAA record for most game winning goals in a career, with 27.

Professional hockey

NWHL
The National Women's Hockey League was formed in 2015 with four teams. Formed by Dani Rylan in March 2015 with an estimated $2.5 million operating budget, it was the first women's professional hockey league to pay its players. Prior to the league's formation, the only choice for top level women's hockey in North America was the Canadian Women's Hockey League (CWHL), which at the time paid bonuses and incentives but not salaries. The league's inaugural season ran on a salary cap of US$270,000 maximum per team and a $10,000 minimum per player. The players also earn 15% of profits from any NWHL jersey sold with their name on it. The league placed its four original teams in markets where many young girls play ice hockey: the New York City area, Buffalo, and New England. In 2018 the league expanded to five teams absorbing the Minnesota Whitecaps. Teams compete for the Isobel Cup, named after Lady Isobel Gathorne-Hardy, the daughter of Frederick Stanley, 16th Earl of Derby, donor of the Stanley Cup.
In addition, select NWHL players were invited to participate in the 2020 NHL All-Star Weekend in St. Louis. They participated in skill competitions and had a USA vs Canada three-on-three game. The NWHL star, Kendall Coyne Schofield competed in the fastest skater event alongside big names in the NHL such as Connor McDavid, Mat Barzal and Nathan MacKinnon. In the year 2019, she finished 7th out of 8 skaters only a second behind the top skater, Connor McDavid. Also in 2019, Brianna Decker completed a demonstration for the "premier passer" event included in the Al-Star games. After she completed the event, fans complained because she placed three seconds ahead of the first place winner and deserved the $25,000 prize. 2019 was the first time woman ice hockey players has competed in the events but no one received any prizes. The NHL gave the NWHL a special three-on-three event as team USA battled out team Canada. After their countless effort in the events, the NHL still did not pay. Instead, they were given appearance fees and a donation of $1 million towards girls hockey. Their appearances in the games have raised great awareness for women in a male dominated sport. More recognition was given to the NWHL, players earned more respect and they definitely added some new fans to their league.

Notable teams

Connecticut Polar Bears
The Connecticut Polar Bears are an ice hockey league for girls under the age of 19 in Connecticut. Numerous players from the Polar Bears have gone on to careers in college hockey at the NCAA Division I and Division III levels. In 1985, Maurice FitzMaurice's daughter Marnie wanted the opportunity to play ice hockey among girls. FitzMaurice and a few other fathers decided to organize a Pee Wee Girls program. The result was the Connecticut Polar Bears. It is the only all-girls ice hockey program in Connecticut, which consists of eleven teams.

Since its beginnings, FitzMaurice has been the President of the Polar Bears. He was also one of the organizers of one of the largest Christmas tournaments in North America. In 2007, the tournament hosted about 275 teams. Games were played across Connecticut. The program has produced numerous Olympians, including Julie Chu, Jaime Hagerman, Hilary Knight, Sue Merz, A.J. Mleczko, Kim Insalaco, Angela Ruggiero, Sarah Vaillancourt and Gretchen Ulion.
The Polar Bears have won 10 championships at the national level.

Minnesota Whitecaps
Minnesota first competed for the Clarkson Cup in 2009 in Kingston, Ontario. The team lost to the Montreal Stars in a one-game final, 3 goals to 1. In 2010, the Minnesota Whitecaps became the first United States based team to win the Clarkson Cup, doing so by defeating the Brampton Thunder, 4 goals to none. In 2019, after moving to the National Women's Hockey League, the Whitecaps became the only team to win both the Clarkson Cup and the Isobel Cup after beating the Buffalo Beauts by a score of 2 goals to one.

Seattle Vamps
As early as January 1916, Frank Patrick and Lester Patrick talked of the formation of a women's league to complement the Pacific Coast Hockey Association. The proposal included teams from Vancouver, Victoria, Portland and Seattle. The league never formed but in January 1917, the Vancouver News-Advertiser reported that wives of the Seattle Metropolitans had assembled a team.

In February 1921, Frank Patrick announced a women's international championship series that would be played in conjunction with the Pacific Coast Hockey Association. The three teams that competed were the Vancouver Amazons, Victoria Kewpies, and Seattle Vamps. On February 21, 1921, the Seattle Vamps competed against the Vancouver Amazons in Vancouver, and were vanquished by a 5–0 score. Two days later, the Vamps played against a team from the University of British Columbia and won the game. Jerry Reed scored three goals (a hat trick) in the game for the Vamps. In both games, the Vancouver media referred to the Seattle team as the Seattle Sweeties. The Amazons traveled to Seattle and defeated them again. On March 2, 1921, the Vamps were defeated by the Kewpies 1–0 in Seattle. In the rematch on March 12, the Vamps travelled to Victoria. The result was a 1–1 tie, and Jerry Reed scored the goal for Seattle. The goaltender for the Vamps was Mildren Terran. After the 1921 season, the Vamps and the Kewpies ceased operations.

Timeline of events
1971: The first known girls' youth hockey program in Minnesota is established by the Lake Region Hockey Association. The first game is played in Arden Hills, Minnesota on January 10. 
1980: The Amateur Hockey Association of the United States (known today as USA Hockey) hosts the first National Championships for girls' pee wee and midget divisions. A team from Taylor, Michigan wins the inaugural pee wee tournament. A team from Wayzata, Minn., is the first girls' midget National Champion.
1981: Senior women are included in USA Hockey's National Championships. Assabet Valley, Massachusetts, wins the Senior A National Championship, while Cape Cod, Massachusetts, wins the Senior B crown.
1984: The Providence Friars women's hockey program wins the inaugural Eastern College Athletic Conference Women's Championship.
1993: Women's hockey is included at the U.S. Olympic Festival for the first time ever. The festival is held in San Antonio, Texas and the US women's team defeats Canada in a two-game series for the gold medal.
1994: The third IIHF Women's World Championship is held in the United States for the first time. The venue is Lake Placid, New York. Canada wins the gold medal game by a 6–3 mark against the U.S. Finland defeats China, 8–1, to finish third once again.
1995: On March 25, Apple Valley High School defeats the South St. Paul Packers, 2–0, to become the first Minnesota girls' state high school champion.
1995: The inaugural IIHF Pacific Rim Women's Hockey Championship, featuring the U.S., Canada, China and Japan, is held in San Jose, California. The Canadian team defeats the U.S. in an overtime shootout to win the gold medal.
1998: The USA Women's Hockey Team wins the gold medal against the Canada in the first ever Olympic women's ice hockey tournament at the 1998 Winter Olympics in Nagano, Japan. The USA women defeated Canada 3–1.
2018: The USA Women's Hockey Team defeats Canada 3–2 in the shootout to win the gold medal at the 2018 Winter Olympics in Pyeongchang, South Korea.

Figures
 Laura Stamm was a power skating instructor in the 1970s and 1980s for several NHL teams, including the New York Rangers, New Jersey Devils and Los Angeles Kings.
 Bella Hartman played for the University of New Hampshire Wildcats and was a member of the United States national team in the late 1980s and early 1990s.
 Erin Nohl played for the Providence Friars and was a member of several U.S. national teams in the early 1990s.
 On Oct. 30, 1993, goaltender Erin Whitten made history by becoming the first woman to record a victory in a professional hockey game. As a member of the East Coast Hockey League's Toledo Storm, she posted a 6–5 win against the Dayton Bombers. In 1994 she received the first-ever USA Hockey Women's Hockey Player of the Year Award. On March 7, 1996, she became the first woman to appear in a professional hockey game in a position other than goaltender, when, as a member of the Colonial Hockey League's Flint Generals, she played at forward for 18 seconds in a game against the Madison Monsters.
 Lynn Olson is considered the godmother of girls' and women's hockey in Minnesota. She was part of the movement that led Minnesota to become the first state to recognize girls' hockey as a varsity sport, in 1994.
 Laura Halldorson was a coach for the University of Minnesota Golden Gophers, and played at Princeton with Patty Kazmaier. In addition, she played with Cindy Curley and Lauren Apollo on the earliest U.S. National teams. Five of the players she coached at Minnesota would later become Olympians themselves, including 2006 U.S. captain Krissy Wendell.
 The late Patty Kazmaier played for the Princeton Tigers. An award for the best player in women's college hockey is named in her honor.
On September 13, 2011, Buffalo native Lexi Peters became the first female ice hockey player to appear in an EA Sports NHL Hockey video game, in EA Sports NHL 12. In previous experiences with EA Sports' NHL titles, she spent hours with the custom team features in an attempt to recreate the Purple Eagles (an all-girls team Peters plays for). The various titles' player creation options did not include a female character build. Peters asked her father why there were no female characters in past video games. Her dad suggested that she write a letter to the company and inquire about it. David Littman, the lead producer of the EA Sports NHL game, received permission from the NHL and EA's lawyers to include Lexi Peters in their EA Sports NHL 12 video game (released on September 13, 2011). EA Sports informed Lexi that they were going to have her as the game's "default" female player that gamers would be able to customize.

Minnesota
In 1994, more than 500 member schools were sent letters by the Minnesota State high school league. The intent was to determine how many schools were interested in starting girls' ice hockey teams. Twenty-four expressed interest as the league was looking for a new sport for Title IX purposes. On March 21, 1994, the Minnesota State High School League sanctioned girls' ice hockey. Minnesota became the first state in the U.S. to sanction girls' ice hockey as a high school varsity sport. On March 25, 1995, Apple Valley High School defeated the South St. Paul Packers, 2–0, to become the first Minnesota girls' state high school champion.

From 1994 to 2002, the number of varsity girls' teams in Minnesota expanded from 24 to 125 (in two classifications, AA and A). In 2001, a three-day girls' state tournament attracted 15,551 spectators. In 1994 there were 1,863 girls in the state participating in organized hockey outside of a varsity high school program. In 2002, the number increased to 6,856.

Awards

Sarah Devens Award
Established in 1996, the Sarah Devens Award is awarded jointly by the ECAC and Hockey East.  The award is named in honor of former Dartmouth Big Green ice hockey player, Sarah Devens, who died in 1995 prior to her senior year.  Kathryn Waldo, a forward from Northeastern University Huskies, was the first recipient. Waldo had cystic fibrosis, and despite health challenges, was a stand-out player for the Huskies during her four years. She finished her career with 106 points in  52 goals and 54 assists.

Minnesota Ms. Hockey Award

Patty Kazmaier Award

Joe Burke award
The Joe Burke Award was established in 1994. It is presented annually to the person who has given outstanding contribution, support, and dedication to women's ice hockey. Joe Burke was a Dedham resident but never actually played the game himself. The first game he attended was the University of New Hampshire and Boston College in 1978 at McHugh Forum. Since that game, Burke has been at every major girls'/women's hockey event in the New England area.

Laura Hurd Award
The Laura Hurd Award is given to the NCAA Division III Women's Ice Hockey Player of the Year. It is named for Elmira College star Laura Hurd, a four-time All-American who lead her team to the first Division III championship.

Bob Allen Women's Player of the Year Award

Other awards
Krissy Wendell, 2005 Bob Johnson Award
Natalie Darwitz, 2008 Bob Johnson Award
2009 U.S. Women's National Under-18 Team, 2009 Bob Johnson Award
2009 U.S. Women's National Team, 2009 Bob Johnson Award

International tournaments
The following women's ice hockey tournaments (featuring teams from other nations) were contested in the United States.

Famous firsts
January 28, 2005: Angela Ruggiero played for the Tulsa Oilers in a Central Hockey League game against the Rio Grande Valley Killer Bees. She was the first woman to actively play in a regular season professional hockey game in the United States at a position other than goalie. In addition, since her brother Bill Ruggiero also played for the Oilers, they were the first brother-sister combination to play professionally at the same time.
2009: Alex Rigsby was the first female to be drafted by the United States Hockey League. She was selected by the Chicago Steel. She went on to play for the Wisconsin Badgers women's ice hockey program.

Number of registered players
1990–91: USA Hockey counts 2,700 women participating in ice hockey.
1993–94: USA Hockey count reveals that the number of women participants has increased to 6,300.
1997–98: USA Hockey now reports 23,010 female players.
1998: Women's ice hockey becomes an Olympic medal sport at the Winter Games in Nagano, Japan, with the U.S. women winning the gold medal.
2005: The number of U.S. female hockey players reaches 52,469.
2006–07: 57,549 female players registered
2009–2010: 61,612 female players registered
2010–11: 65,509 female players registered
2013–14: 67, 230 female players registered
2014–15: 69,744 female players registered
Article by Mike Murphy (theicegarden.com)  Sep 5, 2018, 8:30am EDT:  "At the inaugural IIHF Women’s Ice Hockey Workshop in Copenhagen in July, IIHF Women’s Committee Chairwoman Zsuzsanna Kolbenheyer shared that there are now nearly 200,000 women playing hockey across the world; in 2010 there were just over 170,000. That’s a growth of 17.64 percent in eight years"

See also
 Title IX
National Collegiate Women's Ice Hockey Championship

In other countries 
 Austria women's ice hockey Bundesliga
 Canadian women's ice hockey history
 German women's ice hockey Bundesliga
 Women's ice hockey in Finland
 Women's ice hockey in Great Britain
 Women's ice hockey in Sweden

References

Women's ice hockey in the United States
History of sports in the United States
Women, U